George Ruddick (third ¼ 1881 – first ¼ 1949) was a Welsh rugby union, and professional rugby league footballer who played in the 1890s, 1900s and 1910s. He played club level rugby union (RU) for Brecon RFC, and representative level rugby league (RL) for Great Britain, Wales, and  Lancashire, and at club level for Broughton Rangers, as a forward (prior to the specialist positions of), during the era of contested scrums.

Personal background
George Ruddick's birth was registered in Brecon (Brecknock), he first came to note as a rugby player when he represented local rugby union club Brecon RFC. In an appraisal by former British Isles rugby union captain, Arthur Harding, Ruddick is described as a 'particularly good dribbler … a good tackler' and  '…keen as a terrier.' Ruddick was wounded and badly injured a foot in World War I which meant he was unable to play again, and his death aged 67 was registered in Manchester, Lancashire, England.

Playing career

International honours
George Ruddick won caps for Wales (RL) while at Broughton Rangers 1908…1910 3-caps, and won caps for Great Britain (RL) while at Broughton Rangers in 1908 against New Zealand (2 matches), and on the 1910 Great Britain Lions tour of Australia and New Zealand against Australia and Australasia.

Championship final appearances
George Ruddick played in Broughton Rangers' victory in the Championship during the 1901–02 season.

Challenge Cup Final appearances
George Ruddick played as a forward, i.e. number 11, in Broughton Rangers' 25-0 victory over Salford in the 1902 Challenge Cup Final during the 1901–02 season at Athletic Grounds, Rochdale, and the 4-0 victory over Wigan in the 1911 Challenge Cup Final during the 1910–11 season at The Willows, Salford, in front of a crowd of 15,006.

County Cup Final appearances
George Ruddick played as a forward, i.e. number 8 or 10, in Broughton Rangers' 15-6 victory over Warrington in the 1906 Lancashire County Cup Final during the 1906–07 season at Central Park, Wigan on Saturday 1 December 1906.

References

External links
!Great Britain Statistics at englandrl.co.uk (statistics currently missing due to not having appeared for both Great Britain, and England)

1881 births
1949 deaths
Brecon RFC players
Broughton Rangers players
Footballers who switched code
Great Britain national rugby league team players
Lancashire rugby league team players
Rugby league forwards
Rugby league players from Powys
Rugby union players from Brecon
Wales national rugby league team players
Welsh rugby league players
Welsh rugby union players